The Adventist International Institute of Advanced Studies (AIIAS) (pronounced "I-Us"), is a Seventh-day Adventist graduate  institution located in the Philippines, offering graduate degrees in Business, Education, Public health, and Theology. It is a part of the Seventh-day Adventist education system, the world's second largest Christian school system. AIIAS is a truly international institution, with faculty representing 18 countries. The institution has thus far served students from 123 countries around the world.

AIIAS is composed of two schools: the Seminary and the Graduate School. The library holds over 70,000 volumes and offers print and online journal access, and provides access to standard online databases for scholarly research. It is both locally and internationally accredited.

AIIAS is located in Silang, Cavite, Philippines, about 28 miles (45 km) south of Manila, along the highway to the popular resort town of Tagaytay. It is characterized by buildings with architectural touches representing its Asian locale, sprawling green lawns, coconut palms, and local fruit and shade trees. The campus also houses AIIAS Academy, an international K–12 school which primarily serves the children of students, staff and faculty.

History 
AIIAS officially came into existence on 31 January 1986, through Philippine Presidential Decree 2021 signed by then-President Ferdinand Marcos.  At its start, AIIAS was located on the campus of the Adventist University of the Philippines. In 1991, the school was moved to its current location in Lalaan I, Silang, Cavite, Philippines. On 6 October 1996, in an action taken during the Annual Council of the Adventist Church, AIIAS became an institution of the General Conference of Seventh-day Adventists. It is one of four General Conference institutions; the other three include the Adventist University of Africa, Andrews University, and Loma Linda University.

The AIIAS Division of Online Learning was established in 2001. AIIAS was one of the first Adventist educational institutions to confer master's degrees on students who complete their program entirely online, and became the very first Seventh-day Adventist institution to offer a Doctor of Philosophy degree in Business.

Academics 
AIIAS Graduate School and Theological Seminary each comprises three departments. There is also an English Center serving non-native English-speaking students who desire to learn English as a second language. Most students matriculate into the regular academic programs upon completion of their language study, which usually takes about three months. AIIAS also awards degrees through its Division of Online Learning (DOL), and several Distance Learning Centers (DLCs) throughout the world. Students enrolled in the DOL and DLCs have options between several master's degree programs.

Consistently placing well in the rankings, AIIAS most recently ranked #25 among the Top Universities 2019 in the Philippines.

Theological Seminary 

The AIIAS Theological Seminary is an internationally recognized center for research excellence in the theology and mission of the Seventh-day Adventist Church. The Seminary has three departments: Applied Theology, Biblical Studies, and Theological-Historical Studies. The Seminary offers the following programs:

Professional programs 
Graduate Certificate in Ministry
Master of Ministry (M.Min.)
Master of Divinity (M.Div.)
Master of Arts in Ministry (MA)
Doctor of Ministry (D.Min.)
Doctor of Missiology/Doctor of Intercultural Studies (DMiss/DIS)

Academic programs 
Master of Arts in Religion (MA)
Master of Theology (Th.M.)
Doctor of Philosophy in Religion (Ph.D.)

The Seminary publishes the Journal of Asia Adventist Seminary, a peer-reviewed academic publication including scholarly articles, critical book reviews, and shorter research notes on a variety of biblical and theological subjects.

Graduate school 
The AIIAS Graduate School has three departments: Business, Education and Public Health.

Degrees awarded by the Department of Business include the Master of Business Administration (M.B.A.) with emphases in Management, Finance, and Information Technology; the Master of Science in Administration (M.S.A.) with emphases in Church Administration and Management Studies; and the Doctor of Philosophy (Ph.D.) degree in Business with emphases in Management, Finance, Accounting and Human Resource Management.

The Department of Education offers a Master of Arts in Education with emphases in Curriculum & Instruction, Educational Administration, and TESOL; and Educational Specialist degree (EdS) and Doctor of Philosophy (PhD) degrees with emphases in Curriculum & Instruction and Educational Administration. The department also offers a graduate certificate in Teaching English to Speakers of Other Languages (TESOL).

The Department of Public Health offers a Master of Public Health (M.P.H.) with emphases in Health Promotion, Health Ministry, and Nutrition.

Schedule 
The official school year at AIIAS begins in June and is configured in semesters of two terms each, with an inter-semester between school years. There is a commencement service at the end of each school year in March. Beginning in 2020, the school year will begin in August and end with commencement in May.

Alumni 
AIIAS alumni serve in church, education, and business leadership positions around the world. AIIAS publishes a semi-annual Alumni magazine called Flags.

See also 
 List of Seventh-day Adventist colleges and universities

References

External links 
 AIIAS website
Philippine Presidential Decree 2021
AIIAS Graduate School
AIIAS Theological Seminary

Universities and colleges in Cavite
Adventist universities and colleges in the Philippines
Universities and colleges affiliated with the Seventh-day Adventist Church
Education in Silang, Cavite